Kansas Wesleyan University is a private Christian university in Salina, Kansas. Founded in 1886, it is affiliated with the United Methodist Church. About 800 students attend KWU, with approximately 700 of them studying on the 28-acre campus. The university is accredited by the Higher Learning Commission.

Academics
The university's academic program provides a liberal arts foundation comprising more than 27 major programs granting MBA, BA, BS and BSN degrees. Additionally, the university offers online degrees in emergency management, criminal justice and the Master of Business Administration (MBA). The average class size is 16 students, with a student-to-teacher ratio of 11:1.

Student life
Kansas Wesleyan has more than 30 clubs and organizations including yearbook, an on-campus, student-run television and radio station, and numerous music and athletics opportunities. The Kansas Wesleyan Debate and Forensics Team competes in national tournaments with large, state institutions, and has won more than 50 national titles at various levels.

Athletics

The Kansas Wesleyan athletic teams are called the Coyotes. The university is a member of the National Association of Intercollegiate Athletics (NAIA), primarily competing in the Kansas Collegiate Athletic Conference (KCAC) since the 1902–03 academic year.

Kansas Wesleyan competes in 25 intercollegiate varsity sports: Men's sports include baseball, basketball, bowling, cross country, football, golf, soccer, tennis, track & field (indoor and outdoor) and volleyball; while women's sports include basketball, bowling, cross country, flag football, golf, soccer, softball, tennis, track & field (indoor and outdoor) and volleyball; and co-ed sports include competitive cheer, competitive dance and eSports.

Football
The Coyote football team qualified for back to back NAIA playoff appearances in 2018 and 2019, reaching the semifinals in the former and hosting the first home playoff games in school history.

Notable alumni
 Rebecca Chopp  former Chancellor of The University of Denver
 Thomas Craven  anti-modernist art critic and art historian
 Bill Graves  politician, 43rd governor of Kansas, and former president of the American Trucking Association
 Wes Jackson  biologist and founder of The Land Institute
 Dennis Rader  infamous "BTK" serial killer, attended 1965-66
 Bill Wheatley  basketball player who competed in the 1936 Summer Olympics
 Tunku Shazuddin Ariff — Deputy Crown Prince of Kedah

References

External links 

 
 Kansas Wesleyan Athletics website

 
Educational institutions established in 1886
Education in Salina, Kansas
Buildings and structures in Saline County, Kansas
Private universities and colleges in Kansas
1886 establishments in Kansas